The Pittsburgh Penguins are a National Hockey League (NHL) franchise based in Pittsburgh. The franchise was established as one of six new teams in the 1967 NHL expansion and is currently a member of the Eastern Conference's Metropolitan Division. The Penguins played their home games at Mellon Arena from the team's inception until 2010, when they moved into the PPG Paints Arena. The franchise is co-owned by Ronald Burkle and Mario Lemieux, the latter of which was the only player/owner in the NHL's modern era during the later years of his playing career. Pittsburgh has qualified for the playoffs 36 times, winning the Stanley Cup five times: 1991, 1992, 2009, 2016, and 2017. From 2007 to 2022 the Penguins have qualified for the playoffs for sixteen consecutive seasons. This is the longest active playoff streak in major professional sports in North America.

Table key

Year by Year

All-time records

''Statistics above are correct as of the end of the 2022 Stanley Cup playoffs.

Footnotes
The NHL realigned before the 1974–75 season. The Penguins were placed in the Prince of Wales Conference's Norris Division.
Before the 1981–82 season, the NHL moved the Patrick Division to the Prince of Wales Conference.
The NHL realigned into Eastern and Western conferences prior to the 1993–94 season. Pittsburgh was placed in the Northeast Division of the Eastern Conference.
The season was shortened to 48 games because of the 1994–95 NHL lockout.
Beginning with the 1999–2000 season, teams received one point for losing a regular-season game in overtime.
The season was cancelled because of the 2004–05 NHL lockout.
Before the 2005–06 season, the NHL instituted a penalty shootout for regular-season games that remained tied after a five-minute overtime period, which prevented ties.
The season was shortened to 48 games because of the 2012–13 NHL lockout
The regular season was suspended on March 12, 2020 because of the COVID-19 pandemic. Eventually, the season resumed with the postseason in an expanded 24-team format on August 1, 2020.
Due to the COVID-19 pandemic, the 2020–21 NHL season was shortened to 56 games.

References
General

Notes

 
seasons
Pittsburgh Penguins